Cristante is a surname. Notable people with the surname include:

Bryan Cristante (born 1995), Italian footballer
Filippo Cristante (born 1977), Italian footballer and manager
Hernán Cristante (born 1969), Argentine footballer and manager
Leo Cristante (1926–1977), American baseball player